Amber Sainsbury (born 28 August 1978) is a New Zealand actress.

Biography
She has starred in the Sky One UK television series Hex as Roxanne Davenport. Amber has also appeared in Coronation Street, The Bill, Trevor's World of Sport, A Touch of Frost, the BBC's 'Fairytales' series, and the films Channelling Baby and The Ferryman.

After making 30 Days of Night with Josh Hartnett in 2007, Sainsbury left acting to set up the African-based arts charity Dramatic Need of which she is a trustee.

In 2007 she convinced Academy Award-winning film director Danny Boyle as well as the Shakespearian actor Sir Antony Sher to come on board as trustees. Notable supporters of the charity include the bands Coldplay and Supergrass, actors Josh Hartnett and David Walliams and supermodel and photographer Helena Christensen.

Sainsbury was a contributor to the 2009 Commonwealth Ministers Reference Book alongside the British Prime Minister's wife Sarah Brown on the arts in education . She was a keynote speaker on the role of arts in development at the British Arts Council's Creative Partnerships Conference in 2009 and has spoken at Oxfam and the South African High Commission in London on the subject. In March 2009 Sainsbury was voted one of the year's 'Inspirational Women' by Vogue Magazine, UK.  In 2010 Sainsbury took out British Citizenship. She continues to teach drama workshops in Africa on conflict resolution and gender issues. She is based in London.

On 10 September 2011 she married James Robert Campbell (aka Jamie Campbell) on the island of Paxos in Greece.

Filmography

Film
 1999 - Channelling Baby
 2004 - The Purifiers
 2005 - The Poseidon Adventure
 2006 - The Ferryman
 2007 - 30 Days of Night

Television
 1995 - Plainclothes
 2002 - The Bill
 2002 - Coronation Street
 2003 - Trevor's World of Sport
 2004 - A Touch of Frost
 2005 - Hex
 2008 - Fairy Tales

External links

1978 births
British film actresses
British television actresses
New Zealand people of British descent
Living people